Heffron is a surname. Notable people with the surname include:

 Bob Heffron (1890–1978), politician
 Brian Heffron (born 1973), wrestler and actor
 Edward Heffron (1923–2013), paratrooper
 John Heffron, comic
 Patrick Richard Heffron (1860–1927), bishop
 Richard T. Heffron (1930–2007), director